Ministry of Trade and Industry (MOTI) is a government ministry of Ghana, headquartered in Accra.

The Minister for Trade and Industry is the Ghana government official responsible for running the ministry.

The ministry is responsible for advising the government on the private sector development, trade and the industry formation within the local and the international front. it also sees to the formulation and implementation of policies as well as representing the government in the international duties and bodies like the World Trade Organization. The ministry has eight division headed by the Chief Director and have three other units that aid in the smooth running of the ministry namely- legal, Internal audit and Communications and Public Affairs.

List of Ghanaian Trade Ministers

See also
 Ministers of the Ghanaian Government

Notes
 – Role was merged with the Ministry of Finance in October 1961
 - Ken Ofori-Atta has been acting as Minister for Trade and Industry since 16 January 2023.

References 

Ministries and Agencies of State of Ghana
Trade ministries
Trade and Industry